Brice Conrad (born 18 July 1985, in Pfulgriesheim, France) is a French singer-songwriter and musician of pop rock and folk music and is signed to Universal Music France.

He became most famous for his songs "Fleur de mal" and "Oh la", both pre-releases from his forthcoming debut album La Nuit Bleue due on 4 March 2013. "Oh la" has charted in SNEP, the official French Singles Chart.

Conrad was born in a small village east of France and fell in love with music from a very young age. Starting to sing and write at age 17, he became famous through his online songs, after which he decided to move to Paris to follow a musical career, touring France including opening for Irma. After his debut "Fleur de mal", he was signed to the label Jo & Co/ Play on and eventually to Universal Music. His music is romantic, emotional and melodic, and he was nominated for "Talent Europe 1" for 2012 for upcoming artists, as well as "coup de coeur" at Virgin Radio and NRJ.

Discography

Albums

2013: (due on )

Singles

Awards and nominations

References

External links
Facebook

French songwriters
Male songwriters
Living people
1985 births
21st-century French singers
21st-century French male singers